Markus Wiechel (born 15 April 1988) is a Swedish politician of the Sweden Democrats. He has been a Member of Parliament (MP) of Sweden following the resignation of Lars Isovaara on 29 November 2012. He's currently serving as member for the Committee on Foreign Affairs as well as Deputy for the Committee on European Union Affairs and in two parliamentary delegations (NATO-PA and the OSCE-PA). Wiechel is the Head of the Swedish delegation to the Parliamentary Assembly of the Council of Europe and Vice President of the Assembly.

He’s previously served as Member for the Committee on Social Insurance, the Committee on Civil Affairs as well as the Swedish delegation to the Nordic Council.

Biography 
Markus Wiechel graduated from Hickman High School (Columbia, Missouri) in 2007 and moved to his native Sweden to study Social Services at the University of Linköping but later graduated in Political Science. He is the son of Swedish author and ophthalmology expert Kristina Narfström who is a professor at the University of Missouri and the cousin of Swedish Social Democrats politician Björn Wiechel.

Political life 
Wiechel joined the Sweden Democrats shortly after moving back to Sweden and became the chairman of the Sweden Democrats in the city of Norrköping in 2009. A few months later he became the chairman for the Sweden Democrats regional board in Östergötland.

In the elections of 2010 he became a Member of Norrköping City Council as well as a Deputy of Swedish Parliament (Riksdag). Between 2010 and 2013 he worked as a Political Secretary and City Council Group Leader for the local Parliamentary group.
 
He left the local board in 2012 as well as the regional board in 2015 but has been a member of the national board of the Sweden Democrats since 2011. As of September 2013, he is a columnist in the party newspaper SD-Kuriren. Following the resignation of Lars Isovaara on 29 November 2012, Wiechel assumed office as a regular member of parliament. Since he was a member of the committee on Civil Affairs, he became the spokesperson for housing policies, civil rights and consumer rights. Wiechel was also, between 2013-2014, a member of the Nordic Council.

In the 2014 elections to the European Parliament he ran as the 8th candidate of the Sweden Democrats but the party received two out of 20 seats. Wiechel got once again elected as a member of Norrköping City Council as well as a member of the Swedish Parliament. As of the fall of 2014 he is a member of the committee on Social Insurance and the Sweden Democrats spokesperson for migration and citizenship. Wiechel is also a member of the Swedish delegation to the Council of Europe since 2016, where he is a member of the Committee on Social Affairs, Health and Sustainable Development, and an alternate member of the Committee on Migration, Refugees and Displaced Persons.

On 17 July 2021 Wiechel was awarded the Medal of Honour of the National Assembly of the Republic of Armenia presented by the Armenian ambassador to Sweden Alexander Arzoumanian. Wiechel was awarded the medal for his work on diplomatic relations between Armenia and Sweden. Söder received the Mkhitar Gosh Medal while Karapet and Brozek received the same medal as Wiechel.

Distinctions 
  Medal of Honour of the National Assembly of the Republic of Armenia, (Armenia).

References

External pages 
 Markus Wiechel Parliament of Sweden

1988 births
Living people
People from Linköping Municipality
Members of the Andra kammaren
Swedish bloggers
Linköping University alumni
Hickman High School alumni
Members of the Riksdag 2010–2014
Members of the Riksdag 2014–2018
Members of the Riksdag 2018–2022
Members of the Riksdag 2022–2026
Members of the Riksdag from the Sweden Democrats
21st-century Swedish politicians